The 2014 season is Molde's seventh consecutive year in Tippeligaen, and their 38th season in the top flight of Norwegian football. It is their first season with Tor Ole Skullerud as their manager as Ole Gunnar Solskjær left the club on 2 January 2014 to join Cardiff City. Along with Tippeligaen, the club also competed in the Norwegian Cup and the Europa League were they entered in the second qualifying round.

Squad

Players on loan

Reserve squad

Transfers

In

Out

Loans in

Loans out

Released

Friendlies

Competitions

Tippeligaen

Results summary

Results by round

Fixtures

Table

Norwegian Cup

Final

UEFA Europa League

Qualifying rounds

Squad statistics

Appearances and goals

|-
|colspan="14"|Players away from Molde on loan:

|-
|colspan="14"|Players who appeared for Molde no longer at the club:

|}

Goal scorers

Disciplinary record

See also
Molde FK seasons

Notes
Notes

References

2014
Molde
Molde
Norwegian football championship-winning seasons